Surigao del Norte's 1st congressional district is one of the two congressional districts of the Philippines in the province of Surigao del Norte. It has been represented in the House of Representatives since 1987. The district encompasses the island chains off the northeast coast of mainland Surigao del Norte. Since the 2007 redistricting following the separation of Dinagat Islands, the district now comprises the Siargao and Bucas Grande municipalities of Burgos, Dapa, Del Carmen, General Luna, Pilar, San Benito, San Isidro, Santa Monica and Socorro. It is currently represented in the 18th Congress by Francisco Jose Matugas II of the PDP–Laban.

Representation history

Election results

2019

2016

2013

2010

See also
Legislative districts of Surigao del Norte

References

Congressional districts of the Philippines
Politics of Surigao del Norte
1987 establishments in the Philippines
Congressional districts of Caraga
Constituencies established in 1987